Priyanka Vickram Chaturvedi (born 19 November 1978) is an Indian politician serving as Member of Parliament, Rajya Sabha from Maharashtra and Deputy Leader of Shiv Sena(UBT). Prior to this, she was a member and one of the National Spokespersons of Indian National Congress.

She has also been a columnist for  Tehelka,  Daily News and Analysis and Firstpost. As a trustee of two NGOs, she works to promote children's education, women's empowerment and health. She also runs a book review blog which is amongst the top ten weblogs on books in India.

Personal life
Chaturvedi was born on 19 November 1978 and raised in Mumbai. Her family comes from Uttar Pradesh. She attended St. Joseph's High School, Juhu in 1995, graduating in Commerce from Narsee Monjee College of Commerce and Economics, Vile Parle in 1999. She is married to Vickram Chaturvedi since 19 November 1999 and has two children.

Career
Chaturvedi started her career as Director of MPower Consultants, a Media, PR and event management company. She is Trustee of Prayas Charitable Trust which runs two schools to provide education to over 200 under-privileged children. In 2010, she was selected as a participant in ISB's 10,000 Women Entrepreneurs Certificate programme, a global initiative supported by the Goldman Sachs Foundation for women entrepreneurs.

Chaturvedi hosts an interview programme called Meri Kahaani on Sansad TV.

Politics

Indian national Congress
Chaturvedi joined Indian National Congress in 2010, becoming General Secretary of the Indian Youth Congress from North-West Mumbai in 2012.

Chaturvedi has a significant presence in social media and was known for defending the policies of the opposition  Congress party on Twitter. She criticized  Narendra Modi for not calling out Smriti Irani on lying and filing false affidavit of her educational credentials. Further, she took a dig at Irani by singing a parody to the theme of Irani's previous TV serial Kyunki Saas Bhi Kabhi Bahu Thi as "Kyuki Mantri Bhi Kabhi Graduate Thi".

On 17 April 2019, she posted on Twitter to express her dismay about UPCC (Uttar Pradesh Congress Committee) reinstating some party workers who were earlier suspended for their unruly behavior with her, following which she resigned from the Congress and joined Shiv Sena.

Shiv Sena (Uddhav Balasaheb Thackeray)
On 19 April 2019 Chaturvedi joined Shiv Sena in the presence Uddhav Thackeray and Aditya Thackeray. At the time of joining Shiv Sena she expressed to work as a common Shiv Sainik under the leadership of Uddhav Thackray.

Following the 2022 Maharashtra political crisis and subsequent split of Shiv Sena, Chaturvedi joined the Uddhav Thackeray led faction of the Sena, called 'Shiv Sena (Uddhav Balasaheb Thackeray)'.

Overseas engagements
In 2015, as a member of a delegation of young political leaders chosen by the UK High Commission and Commonwealth Parliamentary Association UK, Chaturvedi visited London to study and understand their democracy. She also participated in "Asian Forum on Global Governance" program jointly organized by Observer Research Foundation and Zeit Stiftung in the same year.

In Feb 2017, Chaturvedi had spoken on the topic of “Impact of Demonetisation on Indian economy” in Melbourne, Australia at an event hosted by former Ministerial Adviser Mr Nitin Gupta. Chaturvedi had also visited the ISKCON Temple in Albert Park, and the Richmond Football Club during her Melbourne trip.

Positions held
 2019 : Appointed as Deputy Leader of Shiv Sena
2020: Elected as Member of Parliament, Rajya Sabha from Maharashtra

See also
 Uddhav Thackeray ministry

References

External links
 ShivSena official website
 

Living people
1979 births
Maharashtra politicians
Former members of Indian National Congress from Maharashtra
Shiv Sena politicians
Indian Hindus
Politicians from Mumbai